In epistemology, transparency is a property of epistemic states defined as follows: An epistemic state E is "weakly transparent" to a subject S if and only if when S is in state E, S can know that S is in state E; an epistemic state E is "strongly transparent" to a subject S if and only if when S is in state E, S can know that S is in state E, AND when S is not in state E, S can know S is not in state E.

Pain is usually considered to be strongly transparent: when someone is in pain, they know immediately that they are in pain, and if they are not in pain, they will know they are not. Transparency is important in the study of self-knowledge and meta-knowledge.

Sources
 

Concepts in epistemology